is a Japanese documentary film director. After dropping out of university to work at a special education school, he made his 1972 debut work Goodbye CP about a group of individuals with cerebral palsy.  
He won the award for Best Director at the 12th Hochi Film Award  and at the 9th Yokohama Film Festival for The Emperor's Naked Army Marches On. That film also earned him the Directors Guild of Japan New Directors Award. In 2017 he released the documentary Sennan Asbestos Disaster which received the 2017 Audience Award at the Tokyo Filmex International Film Festival and the 2017 BIFF Mecenat Award at the Busan International Film Festival.  
His documentary works often depict people who push against the boundaries of propriety and obedience in Japanese society.

Filmography

As director
 1972: 
 1974: Extreme Private Eros: Love Song 1974
 1987: The Emperor's Naked Army Marches On
 1994: A Dedicated Life (Zenshin shōsetsuka)
 1999: 
 2005:  (fictional film)
 2017: 
 2019:

As actor
 2016: Shin Godzilla

Bibliography

External links

References

1945 births
Living people
Japanese film directors
Japanese documentary film directors
People from Yamaguchi Prefecture